Young Left may refer to one of the following political movements.

 Young Left (Austria)
 Young Left (Sweden)
 Young Left (Norway)
 Young Left (Italy)